The Storm was a digital-only, modern rock music radio station broadcasting in parts of Central and Southern UK, and owned by GCap Media. It played music from bands such as Green Day, The Killers, Kaiser Chiefs, The Libertines, Garbage and Franz Ferdinand.

In November 2005, as part of a review of GCap Media services, it was decided that The Storm was to be replaced with Xfm on most digital radio multiplexes. This move occurred on 23 January 2006. Chill replaced The Storm on digital TV.

Live broadcasts on The Storm closed down on 20 January 2006 at 2305 GMT. The last track played by presenter Neil Grayson was Green Day's "Good Riddance (Time of your Life)".

An automated service (including a text-to-speech "DJ") playing the same music format, was left in place on three multiplex areas where Xfm was already broadcast digitally (London, Wolverhampton and Bristol). This was eventually removed in August 2006 from Bristol and Wolverhampton and from the London multiplex on 27 March 2007. Its frequency was taken over by Premier Christian Radio.

References

Defunct radio stations in the United Kingdom
Digital-only radio stations
Radio stations disestablished in 2006
Radio stations established in 2000
Rock radio stations in the United Kingdom
GCap Media